Morten Bo Madsen is a Danish physicist, associate professor at the Niels Bohr Institute. He was a Co-Investigator (participating scientist) on the Phoenix Mars mission which proved the presence of water on Mars.

Early career
In 1989, Madsen joined the Mössbauer spectroscopy group led by Jens Martin Knudsen at the University of Copenhagen. During the 1990s, their research focused on studies of the planet Mars and, based on the ideas of "The Martian", Jens Martin Knudsen formed the Danish Mars Group. This soon spurred a sister-group, the Mars Simulation Laboratory, in Århus, an initiative by Erik Uggerhøj and Per Nørnberg.

Pathfinder Mission 1997
Madsen participated in the design and analysis of the five Danish magnetic properties experiments flown on the 1997 Mars Pathfinder mission.

On the mission, patterns of Martian dust formed on the grey plates with built in magnets revealing the magnetic properties of the dust, thus giving hints of the chemical composition of the magnetic component in the dust and geological formation.
Knudsen's team was one of the two non-US teams who were working with NASA on the Pathfinder Mission, the other team was German.
The results from the magnetic properties experiments showed that there had not been liquid water on the surface of mars for the last 2 billion years.

Mars Polar Lander 1999
After the success of the Pathfinder mission, Madsen's team continued developing the next generation of magnetic properties experiments for the 1999 Mars Polar Lander mission. Two of the three magnetic properties experiments were identical to the ones flown on the Pathfinder mission. Contact with the Mars Polar Lander was lost on 3 December 1999 during landing of the spacecraft.

Mars Exploration Rover Mission 2003
Knudsen, Madsen and their research group designed magnetic properties experiments on board each of the two rovers, Spirit and Opportunity, of the 2003 Mars Exploration Rover mission. Three of the magnets were designed to draw airborne magnetic dust from the atmosphere and four small magnets were placed on the arm, built into the Rock Abrasion Tool. They were designed to capture magnetic dust liberated from the Martian rocks during abrasion.
The dust was analysed by onboard instruments including cameras using various spectroscopy filters. The results from the magnet experiment was considered a success in that they helped the understanding of how the dust on Mars was composed and built up.
Members of the team, including Madsen, were at the control center at the Jet Propulsion Laboratory in Pasadena during the rovers' landing and the first three months of initial data collection.

Phoenix 2007

In 2007, Madsen's team was invited by NASA to design the three radiometric calibration targets for the Phoenix mission called "Improved Sweep Magnet Experiment" (ISWEEP).
The target consisted of an aluminum holder (carrying structure) containing a palette of different calibrated colors of synthetic pigmented rubber with "sweeping magnets" underneath to clear the colored material of the magnetic Martian dust, assisting in calibrating the cameras of the mission

References

External links 
 Lecture on Martian dust
 Lecture on Mars missions
 MARS: The Phoenix Mission, Part 1
 MARS: The Phoenix Mission, Part 2
 MARS: The Phoenix Mission, Part 3

1957 births
Living people
Danish physicists
Academic staff of the University of Copenhagen